Mevo Horon is an Israeli settlement and religious moshav shitufi in the West Bank. Located near Latrun and Modi'in, it falls under the jurisdiction of Mateh Binyamin Regional Council.

The international community considers Israeli settlements in the West Bank illegal under international law, but the Israeli government disputes this.

History

The village was established in 1970 by members of the Ezra youth movement and was the first village in the Mateh Binyamin council area. It moved to the present site in 1974. It is named after the biblical Beit Horon (Joshua 10:10), which was located near the modern Israeli village and settlement of Beit Horon.

Some Palestinians managed to return to the area after their expulsion from the villages of Yalo, Imwas and Bayt Nuba on whose lands the moshav was established, and gained employment as farm hands at Mevo Horon in the 1980s. During the early stages of the Al Aqsa Intifada, when the main checkpoint into Israel was moved several kilometers east of Mevo Horon and further into the West Bank, the moshav made arrangements to pick up these workers at the new checkpoint, though since they lacked Israeli work permits, difficulties arose.

On June 7, 2018, residents of Mevo Horon and Israeli descendants of Dutch Jews inaugurated the town's Chasdei Enosh synagogue, which is an exact replica of the synagogue that once stood in Terborg, in the Netherlands, blown up by the Nazis in early 1945.

References

External links

 Village website 

Moshavim
Religious Israeli settlements
Populated places established in 1970
Mateh Binyamin Regional Council
1970 establishments in the Israeli Military Governorate
Israeli settlements in the West Bank